= Mediterranean Bauxite Province =

The Mediterranean Bauxite Province is a major region of high-quality bauxite ores that stretches for 3,000 km along the northern shore of the Mediterranean Sea from Spain to Turkey, encompassing parts of southern France, Italy, countries of ex-Yugoslavia, and Greece. The province covers an area of about 2 million km^{2}.

== Extent and Age ==
The Mediterranean bauxite region, part of the Alpide geosynclinal belt of bauxite formation, includes geosynclinal depressions and the peripheral parts of platforms and median masses. The bauxites date from the Middle Triassic to the Neogene, although most of the deposits were formed during the Cretaceous.

== Deposits ==
The largest bauxite deposits are located in Greece (Parnassus-Giona region), Yugoslavia (Niksic, Vlasenica, Obrovac, Drniá, Mostar), Hungary (Gánt, Halimba, Iszkaszentgyörgy, Nyirád, Harsan), and France (Brignoles and elsewhere). The first bauxite ore was discovered in 1821 around Les Baux in southern France, from which the ore received its name. The major deposits were found in the 19th century.

== Types of deposits ==
Bauxites of the Mediterranean province generally overlie the karstic surfaces of limestones or dolomites. The deposits form pockets, lenses, chains of pockets or lenses, and sometimes extended sheets. The bauxite sheets tend to slope, either gently or steeply; only on the Hungarian Massif do the sheets lie almost horizontally. The sheets that are currently being mined range in thickness from 1 m to 8 m.

== Chemical composition ==
The ores have a chemical composition of 45–55 percent Al_{2}O_{3}, 2–10 percent SiO_{2}, 15–23 percent Fe_{2}O_{3}, and 2–3 percent TiO_{2}. Losses during calcination range from 12 to 20 percent. Gibbsite-boehmite ores predominate, although diaspore and gibbsite are also encountered. The ores are derived from deposits of the geosynclinal or Mediterranean type. Most scientists regard the bauxites of the Mediterranean province as talus and proluvial deposits having formed from the products of the erosion of the lateritic and subsequently having undergone the process of bauxitization.

== Output volume ==
The annual output of bauxite in the Mediterranean province increased from 6 million to 10 million tons a year between 1961 and 1972. The most economically important deposits are in southern France and Yugoslavia.
